Brajabala Girls' High School is a well-known girls school in Ranaghat, in the state of West Bengal, India. It is situated in Siddeshwari-tola on Rabindra Sarani in Ranaghat town.

History 
The school is named after Brajabala Devi. It was established in 1921.

Education system 
The school follows a syllabus prescribed by the West Bengal Board of Secondary Education. It conducts Pre-test and Test exams a couple of months before the board exam.

Notable alumni
Mausumi Dikpati, scientist at the High Altitude Observatory operated by the National Center for Atmospheric Research, USA

References 

Girls' schools in West Bengal
High schools and secondary schools in West Bengal
Schools in Nadia district
Educational institutions established in 1921
1921 establishments in India